Al-Shabab SC may refer to:
 Al-Shabab SC (Al Ahmadi), Kuwait
 Al-Shabab SC (Baghdad), Iraq
 Al-Shabab SC (Seeb), Oman